Arakel or Aragel, an Armenian given name. It means "To send" in Armenian. With the addition of -ian, it is also a common surname as Arakelyan / Arakelian. 

Arakel or Aragel may refer to:

Places
Arakel, Karabakh, a village in the Khojavend Rayon of Azerbaijan and Hadrut Province of the Nagorno-Karabakh Republic

Persons
Aragel, catholicos of Caucasian Albanian diocese of the Armenian church from 1481 to 1497
Arakel of Tabriz or Arakel Davrizhetsi (1590s-1670), 17th-century Persian-Armenian historian
Arakel Babakhanian (commonly known as Leo) (1860–1932), Armenian historian, publicist, writer, critic and professor
Arakel Mirzoyan (born 1989), Armenian weightlifter
Arabo (1863–1893), also known as Arakel, an Armenian fedayi (freedom fighter) in the Ottoman Empire

See also
Arakelyan, an Armenian surname

Armenian masculine given names